Treytorrens is a village in the commune of Puidoux in the district of Lavaux and is located in the canton of Vaud.

Villages in the canton of Vaud
Villages in Switzerland